The Female Prison is a former women's prison and a Grade I Listed building located in York, North Yorkshire. Since 1938 it has been part of the York Castle Museum.

History
The prison and yard were built in 1780–83 at a cost of £1,540 and to a design by Thomas Wilkinson and John Prince. The frontage of this building matches that of the Court building on the opposite side of the bailey. The prison was altered and wings added in 1802 with a podium and steps added in 1820–50. The front of the building is constructed from sandstone ashlar with the inside of the portico rendered. The prison was bought by York Corporation in 1934 opening as the Castle Museum in 1938.

Executions
The castle area became the regular place of executions in York in the early 1800s, replacing the Tyburn on the Knavesmire. The new gallows were completed on 8 March 1801 at a cost of £10 and 15 shillings and were first used for the execution of a cattle thief, Samuel Lundy, on 11 April 1801. Condemned criminals were hanged in this space, known as 'the Drop', between the Assize Courts and the bailey wall until 1868. From 1868 to 1896 executions took place inside the prison walls at the north end of the Female prison. A total of 153 men and 7 women were hanged in the Castle precincts between April 1801 and December 1896.

Mary Bateman, known as the 'Yorkshire Witch', was executed at the Castle on 20 March 1809.

A 1998 archaeological excavation immediately to the north of the Female prison located five graves, thought to date between 1802 and 1826. The skeletal remains were analysed and are thought to represent executed prisoners from the site. One of the skeletons, an adult female (aged 18–25 at death), had had a post-mortem craniotomy performed on her, though it is unclear whether this was performed as an autopsy or for anatomical dissection in the interests of science. The Murder Act 1752 stipulated that only the corpses of murderers could be used for dissection, though this was changed by the Anatomy Act 1832 which provided provision for surgeons and physicians to access cadavers that were unclaimed after death.

References

Grade I listed buildings in York
Defunct prisons in North Yorkshire
History museums in North Yorkshire
Prison museums in the United Kingdom
Grade I listed prison buildings
York Museums Trust
18th-century establishments in England
Women's prisons in England